Koshkuh or Kashkuh may refer to:
 Koshkuh, Fars
 Koshkuh, Lamerd, Fars Province
 Kashkuh, Gilan

See also
 Kushkuh